PTM may refer to:

 Parent-teacher meeting, a meeting of parents with teachers to discuss the progress of school students
 Pashtun Tahafuz Movement, a human rights movement in Pakistan for the Pashtun people
 Polygyny threshold model, a theory explaining polygyny
 Polynomial texture mapping, a digital imaging technique
 Portugal. The Man, an American rock band
 Post-translational modification, covalent and generally enzymatic modification of proteins following protein biosynthesis by ribosomes
 Post-transition metal, a grouping of chemical elements
 Probabilistic Turing machine
 Pulse-time modulation, an alternative name for Pulse-width modulation